Porsgrunn Station is a railway station serving Porsgrunn, Norway. It serves regional trains on Vestfold Line and local trains on Bratsberg Line, all operated by Vy. The station was built as part of Vestfold Line, then known as the Jarlsberg Line, and opened on 24 November 1882. In 1917, it became a station along the Bratsberg Line. The original station building was drawn by Balthazar Lange, and inspired by the concurrent style on the Østfold Line. The current station building, in red brick, was built in the 1960s. The station has been unmanned since 2002 and is located beside the bus terminal.

External links
Jernbaneverket's entry for Porsgrunn Station 

Railway stations in Porsgrunn
Railway stations on the Bratsberg Line
Railway stations on the Vestfold Line
Railway stations opened in 1882
1882 establishments in Norway